Doug Dadswell (born February 7, 1964) is a Canadian former professional ice hockey goaltender who played two seasons in the National Hockey League for the Calgary Flames from 1986–1988.

Playing career
Dadswell was born in Scarborough, Ontario. As a youth, he played in the 1977 Quebec International Pee-Wee Hockey Tournament with a minor ice hockey team from Toronto.

Dadswell played two seasons of NCAA hockey for the Cornell University, leading the Big Red to the Eastern College Athletic Conference title in 1985–86.   His performance led to his being signed by the Flames in 1986.  Dadswell turned pro the following season, spending the bulk of the year in the American Hockey League with the Moncton Golden Flames.  He earned a call up to the NHL late in the 1986–87 season where he played two games with the Flames.  In 1987–88, he won the backup position behind Mike Vernon and appeared in 25 more games with the Flames.  However, when the Flames acquired Rick Wamsley late in the season, Dadswell found himself out of the NHL.  He bounced around the minor leagues until 1993, but never returned to the NHL and retired from professional hockey in 1993.

Dadswell also played ten games for the Calgary Rad'z of the Roller Hockey International in 1992–93.

In 2000, Dadswell was inducted into the Cornell Athletic Hall of Fame.

Career statistics

Regular season

Awards and honors

References

External links

1964 births
Birmingham Bulls (ECHL) players
Calgary Flames players
Calgary Rad'z players
Cincinnati Cyclones (ECHL) players
Cincinnati Cyclones (IHL) players
Cornell Big Red men's ice hockey players
Ice hockey people from Ontario
Indianapolis Ice players
Living people
Moncton Golden Flames players
People from Scarborough, Toronto
Salt Lake Golden Eagles (IHL) players
Undrafted National Hockey League players
Utica Devils players
Canadian ice hockey goaltenders
AHCA Division I men's ice hockey All-Americans